Albert Weber may refer to:

 Albert Weber Sr. (1829–1879), musician and founder of the Weber Piano Company
 Albert Weber Jr. (1858–1908), Son of Albert Weber Sr. and 2nd president of the Weber Piano Company
 Albert J. Weber (1859–1925), Associate Justice and Chief Justice of the Utah Supreme Court
 Albert Weber (footballer) (1888–1940), German amateur footballer
 Albert Herman Weber (died 1945), husband of Lenora Mattingly Weber

See also
Albert R. F. Webber (1880–1932), Tobago-born Guyanese politician, author and newspaper editor